Barry Dickins (born 6 November 1949) is a prolific Australian playwright, author, artist, actor, educator and journalist, probably best known for his historical dramas and his reminisces about growing up and living in working class Melbourne. His most well-known work is the award-winning stage play Remember Ronald Ryan, a dramatization of the life and subsequent death of Ronald Ryan, the last man executed in Australia. He has also written dramas and comedies about other controversial figures such as poet Sylvia Plath, opera singer Joan Sutherland, criminal Squizzy Taylor, actor Frank Thring, playwright Oscar Wilde and artist Brett Whiteley.

Dickins primarily writes for Australia's independent theatre scene, frequently collaborating with La Mama Theatre, Malthouse Theatre, The Pram Factory, Griffin Theatre Company, fortyfivedownstairs and St Martin Youth Theatre.

Biography
Dickins was born in the Melbourne suburb of Reservoir. Leaving school early he worked for five years in a factory in North Melbourne, and then as a set-painter for television programs being produced at Channel 7. Through his association with La Mama Theatre, his first play, a translation of Ibsen's Ghosts, was performed in 1974. He has written a further 50 since then, along with numerous short stories, biographies, opinion pieces, essays and children's books. His play, Remember Ronald Ryan, won him the 1995 Victorian Premier's Literary Award. He had a long career as an educator, spending 41 years teaching English and creative writing at various schools in Melbourne (including Scotch College, Melbourne Grammar and West Preston Primary School). His experiences in the classroom served the basis for his 2013 memoirs, Lessons in Humility: 40 years of teaching.

Dickins has made numerous appearances on the stage and on the screen. His first acting role was in Barry Oakley's The Ship's Whistles, which was staged in 1978 at the Pram Factory Front Theatre, under the direction of Paul Hampton. Since then he has appeared in: Paul Cox's Man of Flowers (1983); James Clayden's With Time to Kill (1987); Brian McKenzie's With Love to the Person Next to Me (1987); Paul Cox's The Gift (1988; Paul Cox's Golden Braid (1990) (which Dickins also co-wrote); Brian McKenzie's People Who Still Use Milk Bottles (1990); Frank Howson's Flynn (1993); and Elise McCredie's Strange Fits of Passion (1999). He also had guest roles on the television shows Winners (1985) and Wedlocked (1995)

In 1985, he appeared in a revival of Graeme Blundell's Balmain Boys Don't Cry (renamed The Balmain Boys) at the Kinsela's Cabaret Theatre in Darlinghurst, New South Wales. His most recent stage performance was recent a dramatic reading of the monologue, Ryan (a continuation of his earlier work Remember Ronald Ryan), which was performed as part of a QandA event held at Melbourne based bookshop, Collected Works.

In 2009, he published his memoirs Unparalleled Sorrow, which discusses his career and his battle with depression.

2015 saw the publication by Black Pepper publishing of A Line Drawing of My Father, a memoir of the authors' father Len Dickins who served in the Second World War and was a commercial printer thereafter. It also gives a portrait of the working class northern suburbs of Melbourne.

In 2015, Dickins became a Writer-in-Residence and Creative Writing lecturer at Victoria University in Footscray, Melbourne. He held the position for less than 12 months, before being unexpectedly let go by the campus coordinators during the Christmas break.

In June 2017 Dickins was found guilty of making a false police report after claiming officers had conducted an improper strip search upon him. The Magistrate remarked of Dickins' report "for reasons which I truly cannot fathom, Mr Dickins invented a set of facts, which were not true and, in my view, he knew them not to be true". For this Dickins was placed on a 12-month good behaviour bond with no conviction recorded. His then employer, The Sunday Age, was later found to have breached Australian Press Council principles in light of their publication of Dickens' account of the alleged police misconduct.

Bibliography

Plays
 Ghosts [from Henrik Ibsen] (1975)
 A Season of Five Plays [as contributor] (AGP Women's Theatre Group 1976)
 Only An Old Kitbag (Australian Performing Group 1977)
 The Great Oscar Wilde Trial (La Mama Theatre 1977)
 The Interview (La Mama Theatre 1977)
 The Rotten Teeth Show (Pram Factory Theatre 1978)
 The Bloody Horror of Dentistry (La Mama Theatre 1978)
 The Ken Wright Show (Pram Factory Front Theatre 1980)
 Doing His Thing (Restaurant Upstairs Comedy Cafe Theatre 1980)
 The Banana Bender and The Death of Minnie. (Currency, 1981) 
 Interrogation of an Angel (Playbox Theatre Melbourne 1981)
 The Ability to Eat Crow (Menzies Theatre/Festival of Australian Student Theatre 1981)
 Lennie Lower. (Yackandandah, 1982) 
 A Couple of Broken Hearts (1982)
 God and Geoff (St Martins Theatre 1982)
 A Kingly Crown (St Martins Theatre 1982)
 Graeme King Lear (Playbox Theatre Melbourne 1983)
 One woman shoe. (Yackandandah, 1984) 
 The Bridal Suite and Mag and Bag: Two plays. (Yackandandah, 1985)  
 Beautland. (Currency, 1985) 
 Green Room (La Mama Theatre 1985)
 The Horror of Suburban Nature Strips (Yackandandah 1985)
 Reservoir by Night (Russell Street Theatre 1985)
 The Gummy Man in Search of Love (Griffin Theatre Company 1985)
 The Golden Goldenbergs. (1986)
 More Greenroom (1986)
 Eat Your Greens (La Mama Theatre 1987)
 The Fool's Shoe Hotel. (Yackandandah, 1987) 
 Royboys (Currency, 1987) 
 Bedlam Autos (Russell Street Theatre 1988)
 Between Engagements (La Mama Theatre 1988)
 Perfect English (La Mama Theatre 1990)
 Hymie (La Mama Theatre 1991)
  A Dickins Christmas (Playbox Theatre Melbourne 1992)
 The Foibles (Budinskis Theatre of Exile 1992)
 Funny Fiction at La Mama [with Wendy Harmer, William Henderson & Sue-Ann Post ] (La Mama Theatre/Melbourne International Comedy Festival 1992)
 Dear Suburbia (La Mama Theatre 1992)
 Remember Ronald Ryan (Currency, 1994) 
 Dame Joan Green (La Mama Theatre 1994)
 La Mama 30th Birthday Celebrations [as contributor] (La Mama Theatre 1997)
 Believe Me Oscar Wilde (La Mama Theatre 2000)
 Go in Tight (La Mama Theatre 2001)
 Insouciance (Playbox Theatre Melbourne 2001) 
 Claustrophobia (La Mama Theatre 2003)
 All of Which are American Dreams [with Ben Ellis, Melissa Reeves, Robert Reid & Stephen Sewell] (Theatreworks/Theatre in Decay 2003)
 Tyranny (The Builders Initiative/La Mama Theatre 2005)
 Myer Emp (La Mama Theatre 2007)
 The Real Thring (Hoy Polloy/Triple R 2008)
 Flashpoint (fortyfivedownstairs/R. E. Ross Trust 2009)
 Whiteley's Incredible Blue ... an hallucination (fortyfivedownstairs/Melbourne Festival 2011)
 The Way Out: A Masterpiece by a Dead Goblin (La Mama Courthouse 2011)
 A Faboulous Kind of Hatred (fortyfivedownstairs 2013)
 Lost in Ringwood (La Mama Theatre 2013)
 Ryan (La Mama Theatre 2015)
 Speechless (La Mama Theatre 2017)
 The Lost Tangerine Jacket (Riverside Theatres 2018)

Musicals
 Squizzy [with Faye Bendrups] (Think Big Productions 2010)

Screenplays
Golden Braid [with Paul Cox] (1990)
A Woman's Tale [with Paul Cox] (1991)
Touch Me [with Paul Cox] (1993)

Stories
 Post Office Restaurant and Other Stories. (Pascoe, 1992)

Fiction
 The Crookes of Epping Pascoe Publishing, 1984. 
 The Truffle: His life & bump out (Pascoe Publishing 1988) 
 The Mouthless Murderer (Victoria Connor Court Publishing 2015) 
 "Barry And The Fairies of Miller Street" 2012

Non fiction
 The Gift of the Gab: Stories from the life of Barry Dickins. (1981; Penguin, 1987) 
 What the Dickins! A symposium of pieces from the low life (Penguin, 1985) 
 You'll Only Go In for Your Mates. (Allen & Unwin, 1991) 
 I Love To Live: The Fabulous Life of Barry Dickins (Penguin Books 1991)  
 The Australasian Post Great Aussie Beer Guide [with Maurie Fields] (1994)
 Guts and Pity: The Hanging that ended Capital Punishment in Australia. (Currency Press, 1996) 
 The House of the Lord (Vintage 1999) 
 Ordinary Heroes: Personal Recollections of Australians at War (Hardie Grant 1999)
 Heart and Soul : personal recollections of life in the police force [as editor] (Hardie Grant 2000)  (pbk.)
 Articles of Light: Reflections on lowlifes, ratbags and angels. (Penguin, 2000) 
 Black and Whiteley: Barry Dickins in search of Brett (Hardie Grant Books, 2002)  Review
 Unparalleled Sorrow : finding my way back from depression (Hardie Grant 2009) 
 Charles Blackman [with Ken McGregor] (Macmillan Art 2010) 
 Miniatures: Famous and Anonymous Souls I Collided With (Flat Chat Press, 2010)  
 Barry and the Fairies of Miller Street with Lee, J (Hardie Grant Books 2012) 
 Lessons in Humility : 40 years of Teaching (Connor Court Publishing 2013)  
 Footy Works: Australian Football (AFL Media 2014) 
 A Line Drawing of my Father (Black Pepper Publishing 2015)
Heartfelt Moments in Australian Rules Football [as contributor]  (Connor Court Publishing 2016) 
 Last Words: The Hanging of Ronald Ryan (Hardie Grant 2017) 
 La Mama [as contributor] (The Miegunyah Press 2017) 
 One Punch: The Tragic Toll of Random Acts of Violence (Hardie Grant Books 2020)

Children's books
 My grandmother. (Penguin, 1989) 
 My grandfather: Years of hope and vigour. (Penguin, 1993) 
 Joey: A dog for all seasons. (Puffin, 1995) 
The Three Wise Blokes (Salvation Army, 2016)

Verse
 In Light: poems (Melbourne Footscray Community Arts Centre 1978) 
 See What I'm Talking About [as contributor] (La Mama Poetica, 2009)

As illustrator
 The Barracker's Bible [anthology compiled by Jack Hibberd & Garrie Hutchinson; co-Illustrated with Noel Counihar] (McPhee Gribble Publishers 1983) , 9780869140284
 Ten tales for republicans [by Allan Drummond] (Green Barrow 2000)

References

External links 
 
 
 Barry Dickins on Trove
 Interview from The Age
 Drawings
 Saint Dymphna's Bells Poem
 Interview with Steve Dow
 Interview from The War Cry

1949 births
Australian painters
Australian biographers
Male biographers
Living people
Writers from Melbourne
People with mood disorders
Australian male dramatists and playwrights
20th-century Australian dramatists and playwrights
People from Reservoir, Victoria